Rogawica  (German Roggatz, previously also called Rogatsch) is a village in the administrative district of Gmina Słupsk, within Słupsk County, Pomeranian Voivodeship, in northern Poland.
 For the history of the region, see History of Pomerania.

The village has a population of 262.

References

Rogawica